Patti Ann LuPone (born April 21, 1949) is an American actress and singer best known for her work in musical theater. After starting her professional career with The Acting Company in 1972 she soon gained acclaim for her leading performances on the Broadway and West End stage. She has won three Tony Awards, two Olivier Awards, and two Grammy Awards, and was a 2006 inductee to the American Theater Hall of Fame.

She made her Broadway debut in Three Sisters in 1973. She went on to receive three Tony Awards; two for Best Actress in a Musical for her roles as Eva Perón in Tim Rice and Andrew Lloyd Webber's Evita in 1980, and Rose in Gypsy in 2008 and one for Best Featured Actress in a Musical for her role as Joanne in Stephen Sondheim's Company in 2022. Her other Tony-nominated roles were in The Robber Bridegroom in 1975, Anything Goes in 1988, Sweeney Todd: The Demon Barber of Fleet Street in 2006, Women on the Verge of a Nervous Breakdown in 2010, and War Paint in 2017.

For her performances on the West End stage she received three Laurence Olivier Awards, one for Best Actress in a Musical for her performances as Fantine in the original London cast of Les Misérables and Moll in The Cradle Will Rock in 1985, and the second for Best Actress in a Supporting Role in a Musical for Company in 2019. She was nominated for her role as Norma Desmond in Sunset Bouelvard in 1993. She has two Grammy Awards for the recording of the 2007 Los Angeles Opera production of Rise and Fall of the City of Mahagonny.

On television, she starred in the drama series Life Goes On (1989–1993) and received Emmy Award nominations for the TV movie The Song Spinner (1995) and her guest role in the sitcom Frasier (1998). She also had appeared in three Ryan Murphy series, American Horror Story (2013–2014, 2022) and Pose (2019), both on FX, and Hollywood (2020) on Netflix. She has also acted in Penny Dreadful (2014–2016), and Crazy Ex-Girlfriend (2017). Her film roles include 1941 (1979), Witness (1985), Driving Miss Daisy (1989), Summer of Sam (1999), and State and Main (2000).

Early life and training
LuPone was born on April 21, 1949, in Northport, New York, on Long Island, the daughter of Italian-American parents Angela Louise (née Patti), a library administrator at the C.W. Post Campus of Long Island University, and Orlando Joseph LuPone, a school administrator and English teacher at Walt Whitman High School in Huntington, Long Island. Her great-great aunt was 19th-century Spanish-born Italian opera singer Adelina Patti. Her father's side came from Abruzzo, while her mother's side is Sicilian.  Her older brother Robert LuPone was a Tony-nominated actor, dancer, and director who originated the role of Zach, the director, in A Chorus Line. She grew up Roman Catholic.

LuPone was part of the first graduating class of Juilliard's Drama Division (1968–1972: Group 1), which also included actors Kevin Kline and David Ogden Stiers. She graduated from Juilliard in 1972 with a Bachelor of Fine Arts degree. LuPone has a mezzo-soprano vocal range, and she is known for her strong/high "Broadway" belt singing voice. In a 2008 interview, she maintained that she was "an actor who sings", and thankful she "had a voice".

Career

Theatre

1970s: Early career 
In 1972, LuPone became one of the original members of The Acting Company, formed by John Houseman. The Acting Company is a nationally touring repertory theater company. LuPone's stint with the company lasted from 1972 to 1976, and she appeared in many of their productions, such as The Cradle Will Rock, The School for Scandal, Women Beware Women, The Beggar's Opera, The Time of Your Life, The Lower Depths, The Hostage, Next Time I'll Sing to You, Measure for Measure, Scapin, Edward II, The Orchestra, Love's Labours Lost, Arms and the Man, and The Way of the World. She made her Broadway debut in the play The Three Sisters as Irina in 1973. For her work in The Robber Bridegroom (1975) she received her first Tony Award nomination, for Best Featured Actress in a Musical. The Acting Company honored LuPone on March 12, 2012, in an event called "Patti's Turn" at the Kaye Playhouse.

In 1976, theater producer David Merrick hired LuPone as a replacement to play Genevieve, the title role of the troubled pre-Broadway production of The Baker's Wife. The production toured at length but Merrick deemed it unworthy of Broadway and it closed out of town.

Since 1977, LuPone has frequently collaborated with David Mamet, appearing in his plays The Woods, All Men Are Whores, The Blue Hour, The Water Engine (1978), Edmond and The Old Neighborhood (1997). The New York Times reviewer wrote of LuPone in The Old Neighborhood, "Those who know Ms. LuPone only as a musical comedy star will be stunned by the naturalistic fire she delivers here. As Jolly, a part inspired by Mr. Mamet's real-life sister and his realized female character, Ms. LuPone finds conflicting layers of past and present selves in practically every line. She emerges as both loving matriarch and wounded adolescent, sentimental and devastatingly clear-eyed." In 1978, she appeared in the Broadway musical adaptation of Studs Terkel's Working, which ran for only 24 performances.

In 1979, LuPone starred in the original Broadway production of Evita, the musical based on the life of Eva Perón, composed by Andrew Lloyd Webber and Tim Rice, and directed by Harold Prince. Although LuPone was hailed by critics, she has since said that her time in Evita was not an enjoyable one. In a 2007 interview, she stated "Evita was the worst experience of my life," she said. "I was screaming my way through a part that could only have been written by a man who hates women. And I had no support from the producers, who wanted a star performance onstage but treated me as an unknown backstage. It was like Beirut, and I fought like a banshee." Despite the trouble, LuPone won her first Tony Award for Best Actress in a Musical. It was not until she had reprised the role in a production in Sydney when she had finally enjoyed the part and felt comfortable singing the score. LuPone and her co-star, Mandy Patinkin, remained close friends both on and off the stage.

1980s 
In May 1983, founding alumni of The Acting Company reunited for an off-Broadway revival of Marc Blitzstein's landmark labor musical The Cradle Will Rock at the American Place Theater. It was narrated by John Houseman with LuPone in the roles of Moll and Sister Mister. The production premiered at The Acting Company's summer residence at Chautauqua Institution, toured the United States including an engagement at the Highland Park, Illinois' Ravinia Festival in 1984 and played in London's West End.

When the run ended, LuPone remained in London to create the role of Fantine in Cameron Mackintosh's original London production of Les Misérables, in 1985, which premiered at the Barbican Theatre, at that time the London home of the Royal Shakespeare Company. LuPone had previously worked for Mackintosh in a short-lived Broadway revival of Oliver! in 1984, playing Nancy opposite Ron Moody as Fagin. For her work in both The Cradle Will Rock and Les Misérables, LuPone received the 1985 Olivier Award for Best Actress in a Musical.

She returned to Broadway in 1987 to star as nightclub singer Reno Sweeney in the Lincoln Center Theater revival of Cole Porter's Anything Goes. She starred opposite Howard McGillin, and they both received Tony nominations for their performances. The Lincoln Center cast reassembled for a one-night-only concert performance of Anything Goes in New York in 2002.

1990s 
In 1993, LuPone returned to London to create the role of Norma Desmond in the original production of Andrew Lloyd Webber's Sunset Boulevard at the Adelphi Theater. There was much anticipation of LuPone appearing in another Lloyd Webber musical, the first since her performance in Evita. Her time in the show was difficult, and she was abruptly fired by Lloyd Webber and replaced by Glenn Close, who opened the show in Los Angeles and eventually on Broadway.

In November 1995, LuPone starred in her one-woman show, Patti LuPone on Broadway, at the Walter Kerr Theatre. For her work, she received an Outer Critics Circle Award. The following year, she was selected by producer Robert Whitehead to succeed his wife, Zoe Caldwell in the Broadway production of Terrence McNally's play Master Class, based on the master classes given by operatic diva Maria Callas at Juilliard. LuPone received positive reviews, with Vincent Canby writing "Ms. LuPone really is vulnerable here in a way that wasn't anticipated: she's in the process of creating a role for which she isn't ideally suited, but she's working like a trouper to get it right." She appeared in the play in the West End. In November 2001, she starred in a Broadway revival of Noises Off, with Peter Gallagher and Faith Prince.

LuPone has performed in many New York concert productions of musicals including Pal Joey with Peter Gallagher and Bebe Neuwirth, Annie Get Your Gun with Peter Gallagher, Sweeney Todd with George Hearn in both New York and San Francisco, Anything Goes with Howard McGillin, Can-Can with Michael Nouri for City Center Encores!, Candide with Kristin Chenoweth, Passion with Michael Cerveris and Audra McDonald and Gypsy with Boyd Gaines and Laura Benanti for City Center Encores!. Her performances in Sweeney Todd, and Candide were recorded and broadcast for PBSs Great Performances and were released on DVD. The concert staging of Passion was televised as part of Live from Lincoln Center.

2000s 
Since 2001, LuPone has been a regular performer at the Chicago Ravinia Festival. She starred in a six-year-long series of concert presentations of Stephen Sondheim musicals, which began in honor of his seventieth birthday. Her roles here have included Mrs. Lovett in Sweeney Todd, Fosca in Passion, Cora Hoover Hooper in Anyone Can Whistle, Rose in Gypsy and two different roles in Sunday in the Park with George.

She returned to Broadway in October 2005 to star as Mrs. Lovett in John Doyle's new Broadway production of Sweeney Todd. In this radically different interpretation of the musical, the ten actors on stage also served as the show's orchestra, and LuPone played the tuba and orchestra bells as well as performing the score vocally. For her performance, she received a Tony Award nomination as well as Golden Icon Award for Best Female Musical Theater Performance. In August 2006, LuPone took a three-week leave from Sweeney in order to play Rose in Lonny Price's production of Gypsy at Ravinia. Sweeney Todd closed in September 2006.

On February 10, 2007, LuPone starred with Audra McDonald in the Los Angeles Opera production of Kurt Weill's opera Rise and Fall of the City of Mahagonny directed by John Doyle. The cast recording of Rise and Fall of the City of Mahagonny was recognized at the 51st Grammy Awards as Best Classical Album and Best Opera Recording in February 2009.

Following the Ravinia Festival production of Gypsy, LuPone and author Arthur Laurents mended a decade-long rift, and she was cast in the City Center Encores! Summer Stars production of the show. Laurents directed LuPone in Gypsy for a 22-performance run (July 9, 2007 – July 29, 2007) at City Center. This production of Gypsy then transferred to Broadway, opening March 27, 2008 at the St. James Theatre. LuPone won the Outer Critics Circle Award, Drama League Award, Drama Desk Award and Tony Award for her performance in Gypsy. It closed on January 11, 2009.

2010s 
In August 2010, LuPone appeared in a three-day run of Irving Berlin's Annie Get Your Gun where she played the title role opposite Patrick Cassidy at the Ravinia Festival, directed by Lonny Price. That same year, LuPone created the role of Lucia in the original Broadway production of Women on the Verge of a Nervous Breakdown, which opened at the Belasco Theater on November 4, 2010, and closed on January 2, 2011 after 23 preview and 69 regular performances. LuPone was nominated for a Tony and Drama Desk, and an Outer Critics Circle Award for her performance.

LuPone's memoir recounting her life and career from childhood onwards, was published in September 2010 titled Patti LuPone: A Memoir.

In 2011, LuPone played the role of Joanne in a four-night limited engagement concert production of Stephen Sondheim's musical Company at the New York Philharmonic, conducted by Paul Gemignani. The production starred Neil Patrick Harris as Bobby. Harris had previously worked with LuPone in the 2000 and 2001 concert productions of Sweeney Todd. The cast of Company performed the song "Side by Side by Side" at the 65th Tony Awards on June 12, 2011.

LuPone made her New York City Ballet debut in May 2011 in a production of The Seven Deadly Sins directed and choreographed by Lynne Taylor-Corbett. A piece she had previously performed, LuPone sang the role of Anna in the Kurt Weill and Bertolt Brecht score.

LuPone concluded a 63-performance Broadway engagement of her concert with former Evita co-star Mandy Patinkin entitled An Evening with Patti LuPone and Mandy Patinkin. The run started on November 21, 2011, at the Ethel Barrymore Theater and ended on January 13, 2012.

In the fall of 2012, LuPone appeared with Debra Winger in the premiere of David Mamet's play The Anarchist. Despite the play receiving less than stellar reviews from critics, LuPone received widespread praise for her role as Cathy.

In early 2015, she returned to Los Angeles Opera to perform the role of Samira in a new production of John Corigliano's The Ghosts of Versailles, receiving positive reviews. In April 2016, an audio recording of the production was released by Pentatone (PTC 5186538, a 2-SACD album). It won the 2017 Grammy Awards for Best Classical Album and for Best Opera Recording.

In June 2015, LuPone appeared in the Douglas Carter Beane play Shows for Days at Lincoln Center Theater. In October 2015, LuPone, along with the current Fantine on the West End, joined her castmates to celebrate the 30th anniversary of Les Misérables.

In 2017, LuPone originated the role of Helena Rubinstein in the musical War Paint on Broadway, after performing the role in the summer of 2016 in the musical's world premiere at Chicago's Goodman Theatre. Performing opposite Christine Ebersole as Rubinstein's longtime competitor Elizabeth Arden, LuPone stayed with the role for War Paint's entire run at the Nederlander Theatre, from March 7 to November 5, 2017. The show closed prematurely to allow LuPone to undergo hip surgery. LuPone disclosed in an interview that War Paint would be her last musical on stage: "I'm too old. It's been hard—it's been harder than it's ever been. I can't do it anymore."

Nevertheless, in September 2017 it was announced that LuPone would star as Joanne in the 2018 London revival of Company alongside Rosalie Craig as Bobbie in a gender-swapped production directed by Marianne Elliot. For her performance she received her second Laurence Olivier Award, this time for Outstanding Actress in a Supporting Role in a Musical. In August 2019, it was announced that the production would move to Broadway, with LuPone returning as Joanne and Katrina Lenk as Bobbie.

2020s 
A transfer of the successful West End production of Company was set to open at the Bernard B. Jacobs Theatre on March 22, 2020, coinciding with Stephen Sondheim's 90th birthday, but was postponed due to the COVID-19 pandemic. The production returned, featuring LuPone starring opposite Katrina Lenk, with previews starting on November 15, 2021, before officially opening December 9, 2021. LuPone won her third Tony Award for the role.

Following the closing of Company, LuPone resigned from Actors' Equity Association, the union for professional stage managers and actors in the United States.

Solo concerts and tours
LuPone performs regularly in her solo shows Matters of the Heart; Coulda, Woulda, Shoulda; and The Lady With the Torch which sold out at Carnegie Hall. For example, she performed her one-woman show The Gypsy In My Soul at the Caramoor Fall Festival, New York, in September 2010.

She also appears at venues across North America in concerts with Mandy Patinkin, at such venues as the Mayo Center for the Performing Arts in September 2010.

She appeared as the inaugural act at a new cabaret space, 54 Below, in New York City in June 2012. According to The New York Times reviewer, "Nowadays Ms. LuPone generates more raw excitement than any other performer on the Broadway and cabaret axis, with the possible exception of Liza Minnelli.... And her brilliant show, conceived and directed by her long-time collaborator, Scott Wittman, deserves many lives, perhaps even a Broadway run in an expanded edition. It certifies Ms. LuPone's place in the lineage of quirky international chanteuses like Lotte Lenya, Marlene Dietrich and Edith Piaf, who, like Ms. LuPone, conquered show business with forceful, outsize personalities while playing by their own musical rules."

She also appeared as the inaugural act at the Sharon L. Morse Entertainment Center in The Villages, Florida on April 30, 2015, to a sold-out audience of residents mainly 55 years-of-age and older.

Film and television work
Among LuPone's film credits are Fighting Back, Witness, Steven Universe: The Movie, Just Looking, The Victim, Summer of Sam, Driving Miss Daisy, King of the Gypsies, 1941, Wise Guys, Nancy Savoca's The 24 Hour Woman and Savoca's Union Square, Family Prayers, and City by the Sea. She has also worked with playwright David Mamet on The Water Engine, the critically acclaimed State and Main, and Heist. In 2011, the feature film Union Square, co-written and directed by the Sundance Film Festival's Grand Jury Award Winner, Nancy Savoca, was premiered at the Toronto International Film Festival. In it, LuPone co-starred with Mira Sorvino, Tammy Blanchard, Mike Doyle, Michael Rispoli and Daphne Rubin-Vega.

She played Lady Bird Johnson in the TV movie, LBJ: The Early Years (1987). LuPone played Libby Thatcher on the television drama Life Goes On, which ran on ABC from 1989 to 1993. In the 1990s she had a recurring role as defense attorney Ruth Miller on Law & Order. She has twice been nominated for an Emmy Award: for the TV movie The Song Spinner (1995, Daytime Emmy Award nominee), and for Outstanding Guest Actress in a Comedy Series on Frasier in 1998. She had a cameo as herself that year on an episode of Saturday Night Live hosted by Kelsey Grammer.

LuPone's TV work also included a recurring role on her cousin Tom Fontana's HBO series in its final season, Oz (2003). She appeared as herself on a February 2005 episode of Will & Grace. She also appeared on the series Ugly Betty in March 2007 as the mother of Marc St. James (played by Michael Urie). LuPone had a recurring guest role as Frank Rossitano's mother on 30 Rock. LuPone appeared as herself in the season two finale of the television series Glee.

LuPone guest starred on Army Wives on July 8, 2012. She reunited with fellow guest star Kellie Martin as her mother once again. LuPone appeared in the 2013 film Parker, an action-thriller. She voiced the character Yellow Diamond in the animated series Steven Universe (2013–2019) and Steven Universe Future (2019–2020).

In 2013, LuPone was cast in the third season of the FX series American Horror Story as Joan Ramsey, a religious mother with a hidden past, and played herself in the third season of HBO's Girls. In 2015, she appeared in several episodes of the Showtime horror series Penny Dreadful as a cantankerous yet powerful white witch. She returned to the show in 2016 in the role of Dr. Seward, an alienist aiding Eva Green's character. Seward is an adaptation of John Seward from Bram Stoker's Dracula, and claims to be a descendant of Joan Clayton, the character LuPone portrayed in the second season. Also in 2016, she began appearing in Steven Universe as the voice of Yellow Diamond, reprising the role in the movie and the epilogue series Steven Universe Future. In 2019, LuPone played an antagonistic role in Pose, appearing in second season of the series. The following year she teamed up with social media star Randy Rainbow to perform a duet song criticizing Donald Trump three weeks before the 2020 US election.

In 2023 she is set to star as Beau's mother in the Ari Aster surrealist horror film Beau Is Afraid. She will star alongside Joaquin Phoenix, Nathan Lane, Richard Kind, and Amy Ryan.

Views on theater conduct
LuPone has expressed concern about the conduct and etiquette of some theatergoers. "Where's the elegance?" she asked in a blog post on her official site. "I mean, I'm glad they show up because God knows it's a dying art form and I guess I'm glad they're all comfortable, sleeping, eating and drinking, things they should be doing at home and in a restaurant. But it's just not done in the theater or shouldn't be." LuPone has been the subject of some controversy due to the bluntness of her statements on the matter, which on some occasions have risen to her directly admonishing audience members for their behavior during performances.

2009 incident 
At the penultimate performance of Gypsy on January 10, 2009, LuPone, irritated by an attendee taking flash photography in apparent violation of theater policy, stopped in the middle of "Rose's Turn" and demanded that the miscreant be removed from the theater. After he was removed, LuPone restarted her number. The audience applauded her stance. The event was recorded by another audience member, who released it on YouTube. She later stated that such distractions drive "people in the audience nuts. They can't concentrate on the stage if, in their peripheral vision, they're seeing texting, they're seeing cameras, they're listening to phone calls. How can we do our job if the audience is distracted?", and also mentioned that "the interesting thing is I'm not the first one that's done it".

2015 incident 
On July 8, 2015, during the second act of Shows for Days at the Lincoln Center Theater, LuPone grabbed an audience member's cellphone while leaving the stage as the audience member had been using their phone during the play. It was returned after the show. LuPone stated:We work hard on stage to create a world that is being totally destroyed by a few, rude, self-absorbed and inconsiderate audience members who are controlled by their phones. They cannot put them down. When a phone goes off or when a LED screen can be seen in the dark it ruins the experience for everyone else – the majority of the audience at that performance and the actors on stage. I am so defeated by this issue that I seriously question whether I want to work on stage anymore. Now I'm putting battle gear on over my costume to marshal the audience as well as perform.

2022 incident 
On May 10, 2022, during a live conversation with the American Theatre Wing and her Company co-stars, LuPone called out at audience members who were not wearing their face masks "properly" during the event and not adhering to the COVID-19 safety protocols implemented by The Broadway League yelling, "Put your mask over your nose. That's why you're in the theater ... That is the rule. If you don't want to follow the rule, get the fuck out. I'm serious. Who do you think you are if you do not respect the people sitting around you?" When an audience member called out in response, "I pay your salary," LuPone replied "You pay my salary? Bullshit. Chris Harper [the producer of Company] pays my salary". After the incident, a spokesperson for the show said in a statement: "We stand with Patti [...] support her efforts to keep our entire community—from patrons to ushers, cast to stage crew—safe and healthy so we can keep Broadway open". This also resulted in the League extending the mask guideline end date from May 31 to June 30, 2022.

In an interview, LuPone later explained that prior to her dispute with the patron, the patron had already been approached by the theater's Covid safety manager and been asked to wear the mask over her nose and mouth, and that the patron had responded mockingly by placing the mask over her eyes in a dismissive manner. It was the entirety of the patron's disrespectful behavior, not just the manner in which she was wearing her mask, that LuPone was responding to in her outburst.

Personal life
LuPone is married to Matthew Johnston. The couple's wedding ceremony was on the stage of the Vivian Beaumont Theater at the Lincoln Center on December 12, 1988, after filming the TV movie LBJ; Johnston was a cameraman. They have one child. They reside in Edisto Beach, South Carolina, and Kent, Connecticut.

In February 2022, LuPone tested positive for COVID-19.

Acting credits

Theatre 
Sources: Playbill Vault; Internet Broadway Database; Internet Off-Broadway Database

Film
Sources: TCM; AllMovie

Television
Sources: TCM; AllMovie

Discography 
Selected recordings include:
 The Baker's Wife (Original cast recording)
 Evita (Original Broadway cast recording)
 The Cradle Will Rock (The Acting Company recording)
 Les Misérables (Original London Cast recording)
 Anything Goes (New Broadway Cast Recording)
 Heat Wave (John Mauceri conducting the Hollywood Bowl Orchestra)
 Patti LuPone Live (Solo Album)
 Sunset Boulevard (World Premiere/Original London Cast Recording)
 Matters of the Heart (Solo Album)
 Sweeney Todd (New York Philharmonic recording)
 Sweeney Todd (2005 Broadway Cast recording)
 The Lady with the Torch (Solo Album)
 The Lady With the Torch...Still Burning (Solo Album)
 To Hell and Back (Philharmonia Baroque Orchestra World Premier recording)
 Gypsy (2008 Broadway Revival Cast Recording)
 Patti LuPone At Les Mouches (Live Solo Recording of 1980 club act)
 Women on the Verge of a Nervous Breakdown (Original Broadway Cast Recording)
 Far Away Places (Solo Album)
 Company (New York Philharmonic recording)
 War Paint (Original Broadway cast recording)
 Don't Monkey with Broadway (Solo Album)
 Company (Revival London cast recording)

Her live performance of "Don't Cry for Me Argentina" at the Grammy Awards was released on the 1994 album Grammy's Greatest Moments Volume IV.

In 2009, LuPone's 1985 recording of "I Dreamed a Dream" reached No. 45 on the UK Singles Chart It also reached the Billboard magazine Hot Digital Songs and Hot Singles Recurrents charts in the US.

LuPone recorded a duet with Seth MacFarlane (who was in character as Glenn Quagmire) on the 2005 album Family Guy: Live In Vegas.

A live concert special film, An Evening with Patti LuPone, was filmed in July 2012 and released in November 2012 on SethTv.com with 104 minutes of Patti LuPone songs and stories with host Seth Rudetsky.

A new CD of one of her shows, The Lady with the Torch, was released in 2006 on Sh-K-Boom Records. In December she released bonus tracks for that CD only available on iTunes and the Sh-K-Boom website.

Awards and nominations

References

External links

 
 
 
 
 
 
 Patti LuPone Interview
 InnerVIEWS with Ernie Manouse: Patti LuPone (TV Interview)
 Patti LuPone – Downstage Center interview at American Theatre Wing.org
 University of the Arts Show Music Magazine Database
 Patti LuPone concert special on SethTV.com. Filmed July, 2012.
 Patti LuPone Papers at the Columbia University Rare Book and Manuscript Library, New York, NY

1949 births
Living people
American women singers
American film actresses
American musical theatre actresses
American television actresses
American mezzo-sopranos
American Roman Catholics
Drama Desk Award winners
Grammy Award winners
American people of Italian descent
Juilliard School alumni
People from Northport, New York
Laurence Olivier Award winners
Tony Award winners
20th-century American actresses
21st-century American actresses
Actresses from New York (state)
People from Edisto Island, South Carolina
People from Kent, Connecticut